Erwin Deyhle (19 January 1914 – December 1989) was a German international footballer.

References

1914 births
1989 deaths
Association football goalkeepers
German footballers
Germany international footballers
Stuttgarter Kickers players